2011 Mito HollyHock season.

J2 League

References

External links
 J.League official site

Mito HollyHock
Mito HollyHock seasons